Anna Maria Porter,  is a Canadian publisher and novelist.

Life and career
Born Anna Szigethy in Budapest, she emigrated to New Zealand in 1956. She received a bachelor's degree and Master of Arts degree from the University of Canterbury. She started at McClelland & Stewart in 1969 and became president and publisher of Seal Books. In 1979, she founded Key Porter Books and in 1986 she purchased a majority stake in Doubleday Canada.

In 2004, she was appointed to the Board of Governors of York University.

In 1991, she was made an Officer of the Order of Canada for being "instrumental in bringing Canadian titles to the attention of the international market place". In 2003, she was awarded the Order of Ontario. She has been awarded honorary degrees from Ryerson University, St. Mary's University, and the Law Society of Upper Canada.

In 2004 Porter sold her interest in Key Porter Books to focus on writing. She has published three mystery novels and three books on Middle European history. Her most recent book is The Ghosts of Europe, published in September, 2010.

She is married to the lawyer Julian Porter.

Selected works
 Farewell to the 70's: a Canadian salute to a confusing decade (1979)
 Hidden Agenda (1985)
 Mortal Sins (1987)
 The Bookfair Murders (1997)
 The Storyteller: memory, secrets, magic and lies (2000)
 Kasztner's Train: the true story of an unknown hero of the Holocaust (2007)
 The Ghosts of Europe: journeys through central Europe's troubled past and uncertain future (2010)
 Buying a Better World: George Soros and billionaire philanthropy  (2015, Dundurn Press)
 The Appraisal (2017)
 In Other Words: How I Fell in Love with Canada One Book at a Time (2018)

Awards and honours

2010: Shaughnessy Cohen Prize for Political Writing, winner, The Ghosts of Europe
2008: Charles Taylor Literary Prize for Non-Fiction, short-list, Kasztner's Train
2007: Nereus Writers' Trust Non-Fiction Prize, winner, Kasztner's Train

References

External links

 Anna Porter's official website
 Canadians of Hungarian ancestry
 
 

1940s births 
Canadian book publishers (people)
Canadian women novelists
Hungarian emigrants to New Zealand
New Zealand emigrants to Canada
Year of birth missing (living people)
Living people
20th-century Canadian women writers
21st-century Canadian women writers
20th-century Canadian novelists
21st-century Canadian novelists
Members of the Order of Ontario
Officers of the Order of Canada
University of Canterbury alumni
Women book publishers (people)